Laya Zanganeh (born ) is an Iranian theater and film actress. She got her Bachelor of Arts from college of Dramatic Arts in Tehran.
She became famous after playing in the Under Your Protection series at 1994–95.

Career 
In 1992, she began professional theatre acting. The actor Amin Tarokh discovered her acting talent. Mohammad-Ali Keshavarz and Sorayya Qasemi guided her to act in cinema and television. Her debut movie was 'The Secret of Mina' (1996), directed by  Abbas Rafei.

Zanganeh has appeared in several movies such as:

 'Lean on the Wind' (1999)
 'Seven Songs' (2001)
 'Fever' (2003)
 'The Boss' (2006)
 'Quiet Streets' (2010)
 'Self-Harm' (2011)
 'Private Life' (2011)
 'Lovers Die Standing' (2013)

She has also taken parts in various TV series, including:

 'Under Your Protection' (1994-1995)
 'In My Heart' (1997-1998)
 'Born Again' (1999)
 'Zero Degree Turn' (2007)
 'Coma' (2007)
 'Tell the Truth' (2012)
 'Like a Mother' (2013)
 'Aghazadeh (TV series)' (2020)

In 2010, Zanganeh was identified as the IMDb member with the lowest closeness centrality.

Filmography

Series

Film

TV movie

Another name for love (A. Nvrvzpvr, 2011-2012)
Black Scales (M. Ranger, 2012)
Risen Love (J. Afshar, 2012)
Whisper (M Water Prevert, 2011)
Road Crime (J unbelief, 2007

References

External links 
 

1965 births
Living people
People from Tehran
Actresses from Tehran
Iranian film actresses
Iranian stage actresses
Iranian television actresses
20th-century Iranian actresses